Headin' North may refer to:
 Headin' North (1930 film), an American pre-Code Western film
 Headin' North (1921 film), an American silent Western film